Michael Reisz is an American actor, writer and producer.  He was one of the writers of the hit television series Boston Legal until its ending in 2008. He was one of the writers and executive producers for the two seasons of Shadowhunters. Also, Reisz's best known for voice role as Yamato "Matt" Ishida from the anime, Digimon Adventure series, as well as Takuya Kanbara in Digimon Frontier.

Early and personal life
In his early life. Reisz was trained as a lawyer. He went to Georgetown University.

Reisz is gay.

Dubbing roles

Animation
 Bleach - Igoroshi, Robber (Ep. 83)
 Bobobo-bo Bo-bobo - Mary-Go-Round, Yellow River
 Digimon Adventure - Yamato "Matt" Ishida
 Digimon Adventure 02 - Yamato "Matt" Ishida
 Digimon Tamers - IceDevimon
 Digimon Frontier - Takuya Kanbara (Flamemon/Agunimon/BurningGreymon/Aldamon)
 Great Teacher Onizuka - Additional Voices
 Naruto - Mizuki
 Naruto: Shippuden - Mizuki
 Transformers: Robots in Disguise (2001) - Wedge, Landfill
 W.I.T.C.H. - Nigel Ashcroft

Film
 Cowboy Bebop: The Movie - Murata
 Digimon: The Movie - Yamato "Matt" Ishida
 Digimon Adventure 02: Revenge of Diaboromon - Yamato "Matt" Ishida
 Metropolis - Rock

Video games
 Digimon Rumble Arena - Yamato "Matt" Ishida

Filmography

Animation
 The Batman - Prank
 Ben 10 - Kevin Levin (Young Episode "Kevin 11")
 The Mummy - Colin Weasler

Live action
 Power Rangers in Space - Leonardo (voice) (Episode "Shell Shocked")
 DominAtion - Prototype (voice)
 Star Trek: Voyager - Crewman William Telfer (Episode "Good Shepherd")

Video games
 Digimon Rumble Arena - Matt Ishida
 The Lord of the Rings: The Fellowship of the Ring - Legolas

Screenplay writer
 Truth or Dare (2018)

Producer 
 Boston Legal (Season 3; Co-Producer)
 The Client List (Executive Producer)
 In Plain Sight
 Privileged
 Outlaw 
 Shadowhunters (Executive Producer)
 Unforgettable (Executive Producer)

Writer 
 Boston Legal
 Charmed
 The Client List
 Hawaii Five-0
 In Plain Sight
 Kevin Hill
 Light as a Feather
  Outlaw
 Privileged
 Shadowhunters
 Tarzan
 Unforgettable
 You Me Her

References

External links

Living people
American gay actors
American gay writers
American male television actors
American male television writers
American male voice actors
American television producers
American television writers
California lawyers
Georgetown University alumni
LGBT producers
Place of birth missing (living people)
Year of birth missing (living people)